Auricular eczema is an eczema of the ear that may involve the helix, postauricular fold, and external auditory canal, with the most frequently affected site being the external canal, where it is often a manifestation of seborrheic dermatitis or allergic contact dermatitis. This is an neuroallergic inflammation of skin with evident itch.

Presentation 

Small blisters appear on the skin of the external auditory canal and auricle. Then they burst and at the site multiple small erosions with abundant oozing lesions appear.

Management

See also

Skin lesion

References

 

Ear
Eczema